The Center for International Relations (CIR) is a nonpartisan and nonprofit, tax exempt 501(c)(3) organization that publishes various materials about international relations and current affairs. The organization is based in the Washington, D.C. area, though its staff operates in various countries throughout the world.

Activities 
The CIR's core activities include publication of its online journal, publication of special reports, hosting special events and awarding annual prizes for outstanding essays submitted by students.

Outlets

International Affairs Forum 
The International Affairs Forum is CIR's online journal, which publishes articles, opinion pieces and interviews. It also maintains databases of organizations, blogs and institutions active in the sphere of international relations and economic policy studies. The forum's stated mission is to present ‘information in an unbiased manner, regardless of political creed to provide our readers an all-encompassing view of subjects’ as well as to present ‘content from a global perspective.’

Cultural Affairs Forum 
The Cultural Affairs Forum is the sister site of the International Affairs Forum and covers ‘cultural diplomacy’. It publishes articles, editorials and links, in this case on topics such as classical music and politics, and culture as propaganda.

Boards

Board of directors 
 John J. Tierney, Jr., Former executive director of the Congressional Caucus on National Defense, U.S. House of Representatives; faculty chairman, The Institute of World Politics
 James Stockmal, director, BearingPoint
 Dimitri Neos, executive director, Center for International Relations

Editorial board 
 Steven Clemons, New America Foundation
 Ross H. Munro, Center for Security Studies
 Robert R. Reilly, former director Voice of America

Resource board 
 Terrence R. Guay, professor of international business, Pennsylvania State University
 Muhiuddin Haider, associate professor, Department of Global Health & International Affairs, George Washington University
 John C. King, adjunct professor of international affairs, American University (Washington, D.C.)
 Christos N. Kyrou, assistant professor, School of International Service (SIS) at American University; director of the Environmental Peacemaking Program at the Center for International Development and Conflict Management at the University of Maryland, College Park
 Ghada Gomaa A. Mohamed, lecturer in economics, Carleton University (Canada)
 Sahar Khamis, assistant professor of communications, Affiliate Faculty of Women's Studies, and  Affiliate Faculty in the Consortium on Race, Gender and Ethnicity, University of Maryland
 Madhav Das Nalapat, UNESCO Peace Chair and director of the Department of Geopolitics at Manipal University

References

External links 
 
 International Affairs Forum
 Cultural Affairs Forum
 Sourcewatch profile

Research institutes of international relations
International relations journals
Non-profit organizations based in Arlington, Virginia
Online organizations
Charities based in Virginia